Lexington is the largest town in and the county seat of Lexington County, South Carolina, United States. It is a suburb of the state capital, Columbia. The population was 23,568 at the 2020 Census, and it is the second-largest municipality in the greater Columbia area. The 2021 estimated population is 24,208. According to the Central Midlands Council of Governments, the greater Lexington area had an estimated population of 111,549 in 2020 and is considered the fastest-growing area in the Midlands. Lexington's town limits are bordered to the east by the city of West Columbia.

History

Colonial Period

In 1735, the colonial government of King George II established 11 townships in backcountry South Carolina to encourage settlement and to provide a buffer between Native American tribes to the west and colonial plantations in the Lowcountry. The townships included one named Saxe Gotha, which flourished with major crops of corn, wheat, tobacco, hemp, and flax as well as beeswax and livestock, and its residents were primarily of German and Swiss heritage.  Two major Native American trails existed in the area: the Cherokee Path, primary route of English and Scots traders from Charlestown to Native Americans in the Appalachian Mountains, and the Occaneechi Path, which connected natives from the Chesapeake Bay region to North Carolina, South Carolina, and Georgia.

In 1785, the name Saxe Gotha was replaced with Lexington County, in commemoration of the Battles of Lexington and Concord in Massachusetts. In 1781, the Battle of Muddy Springs was fought to the south of the present-day town and the Battle of Tarrar Springs was fought within the present-day town limits.

Post-revolution
Until 1820, Granby was the county seat of Lexington County, but chronic flooding forced the local government to move the courthouse to its present location in Lexington. The area was known by locals as the "Lexington Courthouse" and was not incorporated as the Town of Lexington until 1861.

During Sherman's March to the Sea in the American Civil War, much of the town of Lexington was destroyed by Union forces as they protected William Sherman's western flank as Union troops attacked Columbia. Most of the town of Lexington, including the courthouse, were torched and burned. Like much of the South after the Civil War, Lexington struggled economically, but local farms and the lumber industry helped stabilize the economy after Reconstruction. Many current brick buildings were built in the aftermath of severe fires in 1894 and 1916. By the 1890s, the Columbia to Augusta Railroad and the Lexington Textile Mill prompted the town to grow.

With the advent of the automobile in the 1920s and its mass production in the 1940s and 1950s, Lexington continued to grow as a suburb of Columbia. Additionally, the creation of Lake Murray in 1930 encouraged many to move to Lexington. Between the 1990 Census and the 2000 Census, Lexington's population increased by 198%, and by 83% between the 2000 Census and the 2010 Census.

Recent history 

The "move over law", a law that requires drivers to change lanes when there is a stopped emergency vehicle on the side of the road, originated in Lexington. James D. Garcia, a paramedic, was struck and injured at an accident scene on January 28, 1994 after attempting to assist a driver that had slid off of the road. The South Carolina Highway Patrol listed Garcia at fault, leading to his work to create this law. The South Carolina General Assembly passed the "move over law" (SC 56-5-1538) 1996 and was revised in 2002 to increase the ease of enforcement and fines. A version of the "move over law" is now in effect in all fifty U.S. states and the District of Columbia; Hawaii was the last to pass legislation in 2012.

On August 16, 1994, Lexington was struck by an F-3 tornado, generated from the remnants of Tropical Storm Beryl, resulting in over 40 injuries and $50 million in damages. From the same tropical storm, 21 other tornados were reported throughout the state, including six in Lexington County.

A Murphy Express gas station on Augusta Highway in Lexington sold a $400 million winning Powerball ticket on September 18, 2013. At the time, it was the fifth largest winning ticket of any United States lottery. 

In 2014, Timothy Jones Jr. of Red Bank, a neighborhood of Lexington, murdered his five children in their mobile home. Jones was found guilty in 2019 and sentenced to death. He is currently awaiting execution on death row.

In 2015, remnants from Hurricane Joaquin brought historic flooding to South Carolina. In Lexington, extreme flooding resulted in the destruction of Gibson Park Dam, which led to the subsequent failure of the Old Mill Dam. Gibson Park Dam (pictured right) was reconstructed and opened to the public in 2021; Old Mill Dam was reconstructed in 2022. The flooding additionally resulted in the destruction of several roads and businesses in the town.

National Register of Historic Places

Buildings listed on the National Register of Historic Places include:

 The Ballentine-Shealy House
 Bank of Western Carolina
 W. Q. M. Berly House
 William Berly House
 Lemuel Boozer House
 C.E. Corley House
 Fox House
 Gunter-Summers House
 James Harman Building
 Ernest L. Hazelius House
 John Solomon Hendrix House
 John Jacob Hite Farm
 Home National Bank
 Lexington County Courthouse
 Henry Lybrand Farm
 Maj. Henry A. Meetze House
 Old Batesburg-Leesville High School
 Charlton Rauch House
 David Rawl House
 Simmons-Harth House
 James Stewart House
 Vastine Wessinger House

Government

Lexington has a mayor-council government, consisting of seven council members, including the mayor. Lexington's style of government takes the form of a weak-mayor administration; each member of the council and the mayor has one vote in relation to town matters. The mayor does not have any veto authority or any formal power outside of the council. Each member of the council is elected at-large and serves a term of four years.

On November 5, 2013, incumbent Lexington mayor Randy Halfacre lost a reelection bid to Councilman Steve MacDougall by 18 votes. A recount was initiated but the results remained the same. Steve MacDougall, who took office in December 2013, is the incumbent mayor of Lexington, currently serving his second term.

In 2015, Lexington's town council voted in a 5-1 motion to impose a 2% hospitality tax on all prepared food items. As a result, any prepared food item sold in the town, such as fast food or restaurant food items, has a total tax of 9%. The council vote garnered criticism after a county-wide tax referendum failed the year before; if passed the county would have increased sales tax by 1% for traffic improvements. The tax generates over two million dollars annually, and the town uses the funds for road and traffic improvement, including the addition of turn lanes, the upgrading of traffic lights, and the improving of intersections. The largest project completed was the conversion of South Carolina Highway 6 and Church Street to one-way streets in downtown Lexington in 2019. Future projects include the building of an overpass over Interstate 20 and the widening of SC Highway 6.

On July 2, 2020, the town council passed a town ordinance requiring citizens to wear face masks in public to combat the COVID-19 pandemic in South Carolina. Councilman Todd Carnes drew criticism after stating three time in the council meeting that the government has "infinite power" to create laws such as these, but opposed enacting a face mask ordinance because "science does not indicate that it helps."

Elected Officials

Geography
Lexington is located in northeastern Lexington County at  (33.980975, -81.230839).

The town is drained on the north by Fourteenmile Creek and on the south by Twelvemile Creek, both northeast-flowing tributaries of the Saluda River.

Climate
July averages the most yearly precipitation. Lexington averages  of rain per year; Lexington averages  of snow per year.

Economy
 In 2022, retail sale within the town accounted for nearly $2.5 billion. In 2020, the medium household income was $74,996 and the percentage of residents living below the poverty line was 9.11%. According to the Town's 2020 Comprehensive Annual Financial Report, the top employers in the city are:

Transportation

Public transportation 
Public transportation in Lexington is provided by the COMET, or officially the Central Midlands Regional Transit Authority (CMRTA). The bus system is the main public transit system for the greater Columbia area.

Roads and highways

Interstate highways
 I-20 – Interstate 20 travels from west to east and connects Columbia to Atlanta and Augusta in the west and Florence in the east. It serves the nearby towns and suburbs of West Columbia, Oak Grove, and Red Bank.

U.S. routes
 U.S. 1
 U.S. 378

S.C. highways
 SC 6

Tourism

Slightly north of the town of Lexington rests one of South Carolina's major lakes, Lake Murray. The Saluda Dam, or Lake Murray Dam, provides electricity for the surrounding region. A public swimming area is open during the summer months on the Lexington side of the dam.
Lexington County Blowfish Baseball Stadium
Lexington Community Band
Icehouse Amphitheater-hosted Florida's Sister Hazel in 2018, and Greenville's Edwin McCain in 2017
Three public parks: Virginia Hilton Park, Gibson Pond Park, and Corely Street Water Park 
Lexington County Museum
Fourteen-Mile Creek Trail
Gipson Pond Park

Demographics

2020 census

As of the 2020 United States census, there were 23,568 people, 7,907 households, and 5,270 families residing in the town.

2010 census
As of the census of 2010, there were 17,870 people, 8,101 households, and 2,558 families residing in the town. Since 2000, the town population grew from nearly 10,000 inhabitants to 25,000, a 166% increase. Since 2005, 3,200 new homes have been built within the town limits, as well as 130 new businesses.

In the 2010 census, the racial makeup of the town was 83.88% White, 12.48% Black or African American, 0.18% Native American, 2.05% Asian, 0.03% Pacific Islander, 0.67% from other races, and 0.70% from two or more races. Hispanic or Latino of any race were 1.91% of the population.

There were 3,644 households, out of which 40.5% had children under the age of 18 living with them, 55.9% were married couples living together, 12.3% had a female householder with no husband present, and 29.8% were non-families. 24.9% of all households were made up of individuals, and 7.5% had someone living alone who was 65 years of age or older. The average household size was 2.51 and the average family size was 3.03.

In the town, the population was spread out, with 27.1% under the age of 18, 7.5% from 18 to 24, 39.6% from 25 to 44, 18.3% from 45 to 64, and 7.5% who were 65 years of age or older. The median age was 33 years. For every 100 females, there were 97.6 males. For every 100 females age 18 and over, there were 96.3 males.

The median income for a household in the town was $53,865, and the median income for a family was $65,694. Males had a median income of $44,883 versus $29,020 for females. The per capita income for the town was $23,416. About 5.2% of families and 7.2% of the population were below the poverty line, including 7.3% of those under age 18 and 14.5% of those age 65 or over.

Education

Public education in Lexington is administered by Lexington County School District One, which has an enrollment of over 27,000 students and employees 3,900 faculty and staff.

Library
Lexington has a branch of the Lexington County Public Library.

Neighboring towns and cities
Municipalities within  of the center of Lexington, listed clockwise:

Cayce (east 9.5 miles)
Springdale (east 7.5 miles)
Pine Ridge (southeast 9 miles)
South Congaree (southeast 7.5 miles)
Gilbert (west-southwest 10 miles)
Summit (west-southwest 11.5 miles) 
Chapin (northwest 14.5 miles)
Irmo (north-northeast 8 miles)
Columbia (east-northeast 11.5 miles)
West Columbia (east-northeast 9.5 miles)

Notable people
 Nick Ciuffo, 2013 first-round pick by the Tampa Bay Rays
 Manuel S. Corley, congressman (1868-1869)
 Nikki Haley, former United States Ambassador to the United Nations and 116th governor of South Carolina  
 Timothy Jones Jr., known for murdering his five children in 2014.
 Lacie Lybrand, Miss South Carolina USA 2006
 Bob Peeler, former lieutenant governor (1995–2003), trustee of Clemson University
 Shaq Roland, former South Carolina Gamecocks and West Georgia Wolves wide receiver, and former member of the Chicago Bears practice squad 
 Floyd Spence, congressman from 1970 to 2001 and resident of Lexington while in office
 Demetris Summers, former Canadian football running back for the Calgary Stampeders
 Harold E. Wilson, Marine in Korean War; awarded Congressional Medal of Honor
 John Boozer, former professional baseball player for the Philadelphia Phillies

Notes

References

External links
 
 Lexington County Chronicle and the Dispatch-News, newspaper

Towns in Lexington County, South Carolina
Populated places established in 1820
Towns in South Carolina
County seats in South Carolina
Columbia metropolitan area (South Carolina)